Olga Govortsova was the defending champion, but chose not to participate.

Lauren Davis won the title, defeating Ajla Tomljanović in the final, 6–3, 2–6, 7–6(7–2).

Seeds

Main draw

Finals

Top half

Bottom half

External Links
 Main draw
 Main draw (pdf)
 Qualifying draw (pdf)

Dow Corning Tennis Classic - Singles
Dow Corning Tennis Classic